"Lost for Words" is a song recorded by English rock band Pink Floyd, focused on forgiveness, written by guitarist and lead singer David Gilmour and his spouse Polly Samson for the band's 14th studio album, The Division Bell. It appears as the penultimate track on the album. The lyrics, mostly penned by Samson, are a bitterly sarcastic reflection on Gilmour's then-strained relationship with former bandmate Roger Waters . The song was released to US rock radio the week of the album's release, succeeding "Keep Talking", the previous promotional release, released the week before. The song reached #53 in the Canadian singles chart. It is the only song on the album to be rated explicit.

Track listing

Personnel
Pink Floyd
David Gilmour – acoustic guitar, additional electric guitar, bass, lead vocals
Richard Wright – keyboards, Hammond organ
Nick Mason – drums, tambourine

Additional musicians:
Jon Carin - piano, harmonium, synthesizers, fx

Charts

Release history

References

1994 songs
Rock ballads
Blues rock songs
Songs about music
Protest songs
Pink Floyd songs
Songs written by David Gilmour
Songs with lyrics by Polly Samson
Song recordings produced by Bob Ezrin
Song recordings produced by David Gilmour